Donald Nardo (born February 22, 1947) is an American historian, composer, and writer. With more than five hundred and forty published books, he is one of the most prolific authors in the United States, and one of the country's foremost writers of historical works for children and teens.

History

Childhood and education
Don Nardo was born in Columbia, Missouri.

With his younger brother, Philip (born 1949), Nardo spent the first few years of his life on the road as his parents, who were popular nightclub entertainers that traveled throughout the country.

In the early 1950s, the family settled in Natick, Massachusetts, where Nardo was at first home-schooled, but he later attended the local public schools. As he grew older, he developed an interest in many of the fields he would later pursue professionally, including acting, music, history, and writing. In high school, he performed in numerous plays and was voted best actor in his senior class. Outside of school, he learned to play the trumpet and began composing chamber and orchestral music, including a four-movement symphony at age fourteen. However, having little formal musical training, he was initially unable to notate these pieces properly, so in the next few years he taught himself to do so by studying books on orchestration.

After graduating from high school in 1965, Nardo majored in theater at Syracuse University, but left after a few semesters to pursue an acting career in New York City. Later, in the 1970s, he returned to school, graduating magna cum laude with a degree in history from Worcester State College (now Worcester State University).

Early professional work
As a young character actor, Nardo appeared in numerous stage productions, including work in summer stock in upstate New York and dinner theater in the American South. He also worked with the National Shakespeare Company under producer-director Philip Meister, including productions of Macbeth, Othello, and As You Like It. Later, Nardo's theatrical interests shifted more to writing screenplays and teleplays. While working on his first few scripts, he taught high school social studies and English in Barnstable, Massachusetts. One of these screenplays, The Bet, won a $5,000 award from the Massachusetts Artists Foundation in 1982. Among the teleplays was an episode of ABC's Spenser: For Hire, starring Robert Urich. Titled "Skeletons in the Closet," it guest starred E.G. Marshall and Boyd Gaines. Nardo also co-wrote, produced and directed a low-budget feature film, In Deadly Heat, which was distributed as Stuff Stephanie in the Incinerator by Troma Entertainment and released to the video market in 1990 by Media Home Entertainment.

Writing career
Although Nardo had avidly studied history informally since childhood and had acquired a degree in history in the 1970s, he did not begin writing history books until the 1980s. A chance assignment by a Boston-based publisher to write several chapters of a new high-school-level history textbook led to offers from several young adult publishers. In the years that followed, the offers kept coming, as did positive reviews from School Library Journal, Booklist, and other noted journals. He joined the Association of Ancient Historians in the 1990s. And by 2004, he had penned more than a hundred books about the Greeks, Romans, Egyptians, Assyrians, Babylonians, Persians, and other ancient peoples. In that same year, noted classical historian Victor Davis Hanson stated online: “There is an entire series of great children’s books [about ancient history] by Don Nardo, who has emerged as the premier practitioner of that important craft."
At the request of Chelsea House, Scholastic, Lucent Books, Compass Point Books, Morgan Reynolds, and other publishers, Nardo also wrote numerous books about medieval civilization, among them a biography of the eccentric Danish astronomer Tycho Brahe that won a special commendation by the National Science Teachers Association. In addition, he fulfilled numerous requests to write books about modern history, including several studies of Native American culture, America's wars, and the U.S. founders and their writings. His 2012 book Migrant Mother was nominated for numerous best book of the year awards and won the Spur Award for Best Western Juvenile Nonfiction,as well as citations from the Bank Street Children's Book Committee, the Midwest Independent Publishers Association, and the Pennsylvania School Librarians Association. Another 2012 volume, Destined for Space, won an award from the American Astronautical Society. Moreover, in September 2014, for the first time Nardo briefly switched his focus from nonfiction to fiction by publishing his first novel, titled Cloak of Destiny. He calls it a "cosmic mystery." One of its main story lines, he says, deals with a modern archaeologist who "has discovered an astonishing secret in the deserts of Israel, revealing some startling previously unknown truths about humankind’s place in the universe." That excavator has "no doubt in his mind" that when the public finds out about these mind-bending discoveries, "the world as people now know it will change forever."

Music
Meanwhile, Nardo continued to compose music, including five more symphonies; concertos for violin, cello, piano, clarinet, French horn, trumpet, and bassoon; a double concerto for violin, cello, and orchestra; a piano trio; two piano sonatas; six string quartets; a ballet based on the exploits of Cleopatra; a dectet (chamber work for ten players); a musical tribute to Thomas Jefferson; incidental music for stage plays, including a large-scale school production of The Hobbit, for which he also conducted the pit orchestra; several romances arranged for strings or orchestra; an oratorio based on the King Arthur legends, and other works. In 1987 the Cape Cod Symphony Orchestra, conducted by Royston Nash, commissioned him to compose a concert piece for children based on H.G. Wells's The War of the Worlds. A more recent commission came in 2008 from Portuguese-American violinist Pedro Ferreira—a double concerto for violin and Portuguese guitar, the first major concert piece ever written for the latter instrument. Between 2008 and 2010, Nardo was the resident composer and arranger for Ferreira's Connecticut-based Amadis Orchestra. Another commission from the Cape Cod Symphony, now under conductor Jung-Ho Pak, came in 2011, part of the orchestra's 50th anniversary celebration. Titled Cape Cod Impressions, the large-scale orchestral piece was accompanied by photos of the Cape projected onto huge screens and received standing ovations at all performances. In 2013, Nardo completed another commission from Peter Ferreira, this time a set of more than a dozen orchestral arrangements of popular songs for a special pops concert in which Ferreira performed with Connecticut's Cheshire Symphony Orchestra, conducted by Richard Brooks.

Personal life
Nardo has been married twice. The first union produced a son, Dana (born 1972), who became a graphic artist and animator. Nardo and his second wife, Christine, are avid animal lovers who have a particular fondness for dogs and presently share their home in Massachusetts with a yellow lab named Daisy. They also enjoy traveling and have made frequent trips to Greece and other countries that Nardo frequently writes about.

Selected works
Krakatoa. Lucent Books, 1990. 
Gravity: The Universal Force. Lucent Books, 1990. 
World War II: The War in the Pacific. Lucent Books, 1991. 
Eating Disorders. Lucent Books, 1991. 
The Persian Gulf War. Lucent Books, 1991. 
The War of 1812. Lucent Books, 1991. 
Anxiety and Phobias. Chelsea House, 1992. 
Charles Darwin. Chelsea House, 1993. 
Medical Diagnosis. Chelsea House, 1993. 
Greek and Roman Theater. Lucent Books, 1994. 
The Battle of Marathon. Lucent Books, 1995. 
Traditional Japan. Lucent Books, 1995. 
Modern Japan. Lucent Books, 1995. 
Braving the New World: 1619–1784, From the Arrival of the Enslaved Africans to the End of the American Revolution. Chelsea House, 1995. 
The Age of Pericles. Lucent Books, 1996. 
The Age of Augustus. Lucent Books, 1996. 
Franklin D. Roosevelt, U.S. president. Chelsea House, 1996. 
The Punic Wars. Lucent Books, 1996. 
Life on a Medieval Pilgrimage. Lucent Books, 1996. 
The Bill of Rights. Greenhaven Press, 1997. 
The Collapse of the Roman Republic. Lucent Books, 1997. 
Readings on A Tale of Two Cities. Editor, Greenhaven Press, 1997. 
The Trial of Socrates. Lucent Books, 1997. 
Readings on the Canterbury Tales. Editor, Greenhaven Press, 1997. 
The Scopes Trial. Lucent Books, 1997. 
The Medieval Castle. Lucent Books, 1998. 
Readings on Romeo and Juliet. Editor, Greenhaven Press, 1998. 
The Rise of Nazi Germany. Editor, Greenhaven Press, 1998. 
Women Leaders of Nations. Lucent Books, 1998. 
Life of a Roman Slave. Lucent Books, 1998. 
The Assyrian Empire. Lucent Books, 1998. 
Readings on Homer. Editor, Greenhaven Press, 1998. 
Rulers of Ancient Rome. Lucent Books, 1998. 
Readings on Sophocles' Antigone. Editor, Greenhaven Press, 1999.  
Greek and Roman Sport. Lucent Books, 1999. 
The Declaration of Independence: A Model for Individual Rights. Lucent Books, 1999. 
Readings on Julius Caesar. Editor, Greenhaven Press, 1999. 
The Mexican-American War. Lucent Books, 1999. 
Readings on Hamlet. Editor, Greenhaven Press, 1999. 
Readings on Othello. Editor, Greenhaven Press, 2000. 
Games of Ancient Rome. Lucent Books, 2000. 
Greek Drama. Editor, Greenhaven Press, 2000. 
Women of Ancient Greece. Lucent Books, 2000. 
Readings on Frankenstein. Editor, Greenhaven Press, 2000. 
Life in Ancient Athens. Lucent Books, 2000. 
Francisco Coronado. Franklin Watts, 2001. 
The Ancient Romans. Lucent Books, 2001. 
The End of Ancient Rome. Greenhaven Press, 2001. 
The Ancient Greeks. Lucent Books, 2001. 
The Complete History of Ancient Greece. Greenhaven Press, 2001. 
Greenhaven Encyclopedia of Ancient Rome. Greenhaven Press, 2001. 
Egyptian Mythology. Enslow Publishers, 2001. 
Roman Roads and Aqueducts. Lucent Books, 2001. 
Readings on Euripides' Medea. Editor, Greenhaven Press, 2001. 
Understanding Hamlet. Lucent Books, 2001. 
Daily Life in Ancient Rome. KidHaven Press, 2002. 
Greek Temples. Franklin Watts, 2002. 
Greenhaven Encyclopedia of Greek and Roman Mythology. Greenhaven Press, 2002. 
Wrestling. Lucent books, 2002. 
The Solar System. KidHaven Press, 2002. 
Pyramids of Egypt. Franklin Watts, 2002. 
The Indian Wars: From Frontier to Reservation. Lucent Books, 2002. 
Roman Amphitheaters. Franklin Watts, 2002. 
Life of a Roman Gladiator. Lucent Books, 2003. 
From Founding to Fall: A History of Rome. Lucent Books, 2003. 
Ancient Persia. Blackbirch Press, 2003. 
Great Elizabethan Playwrights. Lucent Books, 2003. 
Adolf Hitler. Lucent Books, 2003. 
The Italian Renaissance. KidHaven Press, 2003. 
Women of Ancient Rome. Lucent Books, 2003. 
Andrew Johnson. Children's Press, 2004. 
The Roman Army: Instrument of Power. Lucent Books, 2oo4. 
Philosophy and Science in Ancient Greece: The Pursuit of Knowledge. Lucent Books, 2004. 
The Ancient Greeks At Home and At Work. Lucent Books, 2004. 
The Trial of Galileo. Lucent Books, 2004. 
The 1940s. KidHaven Press, 2004. 
Black Holes. Lucent Books, 2004. 
The Byzantine Empire. Blackbirch Press, 2005. 
The Etruscans. Lucent Books, 2005. 
The Ice Ages. KidHaven Press, 2005. 
The Minoans. Lucent Books, 2005. 
The Globe Theater. Blackbirch Press, 2005. 
Cleopatra: Egypt's Last Pharaoh. Lucent Books, 2005. 
Mummies, Myth, and Magic: Religion in Ancient Egypt. Lucent Books, 2005. 
Artistry in Stone: Great Structures of Ancient Egypt. Lucent Books, 2005. 
The Creation of the U.S. Constitution. Greenhaven Press, 2005. 
A Travel Guide to Ancient Pompeii. Lucent Books, 2005. 
King Tut's Tomb. KidHaven Press, 2005. 
The Age of Colonialism. Lucent Books, 2006. 
Pericles: Great Leader of Athens. Enslow Books, 2006. 
The Search for Extraterrestrial Life. Lucent books, 2006. 
The Roman Republic. Lucent Books, 2006. 
The Roman Empire. Lucent Books, 2006. 
Greenhaven Encyclopedia of Ancient Greece. Greenhaven Press, 2007. 0737733888
Greenhaven Encyclopedia of Ancient Mesopotamia. Greenhaven Press, 2007. 
The Salem Witch Trials. Lucent Books, 2007. 
History of Architecture. Lucent Books, 2008. 
France. Children's Press, 2008. 
The Civil War. Lucent Books, 2008. 
Clara Barton: "Face Danger, But Never Fear It." Enslow Publishers, 2008.  
Ancient India. Lucent Books, 2008. 
The Battle of Saratoga. Compass Point Books, 2008. 
Mathew Brady: The Camera is the Eye of History. Enslow Publishers, 2008. 
Tycho Brahe: Pioneer of Astronomy. Compass Point Books, 2008. 
The Atlantic Slave Trade. Lucent Books, 2008. 
Early Native North Americans. Lucent Books, 2008. 
Julius Caesar: Roman General and Statesman. Compass Point Books, 2009. 
Peoples and Empires of Ancient Mesopotamia. Lucent Books, 2009. 
Arts and Literature in Ancient Mesopotamia. Lucent Books, 2009. 
The Industrial Revolution in Britain. Lucent Books, 2009. 
The Industrial Revolution in the United States. Lucent Books, 2009. 
Maya Angelou: Poet, Performer, Activist. Compass Point Books, 2009. 
Alexander the Great: Conqueror of the Known World. Morgan Reynolds, 2010. 
Buddhism. Compass Point Books, 2010. 
The History of Television. Gale, Cengage, 2010. 
Extreme Threats: Climate Change. Morgan Reynolds, 2010. 
Extreme Threats: Asteroids and Comets. Morgan Reynolds, 2010. 
Extreme Threats: Volcanoes. Morgan Reynolds, 2010. 
The Vikings. Lucent Books, 2010. 
Religious Beliefs in Colonial America. Gale, Cengage, 2010. 
The History of Terrorism. Compass Point Books, 2010. 
Aztec Civilization. Lucent Books, 2010. 
The Theory of Evolution: A History of Life on Earth. Compass Point Books, 2010. 
United in Cause: The Sons of Liberty. Compass Point Books, 2010. 
The Islamic Empire. Gale, Cengage, 2011. 
Migrant Mother. Compass Point Books, 2011. 
The Rwandan Genocide. Gale, Cengage, 2011. 
The Women's Movement. Lucent Books, 2011. 
The Black Death. Gale, Cengage, 2011. 
Bull Run to Gettysburg: Early Battles of the Civil War. Compass Point Books, 2011. 
History of Painting. Gale, Cengage, 2011. 
Medieval Europe. Morgan Reynolds, 2011. 
The Scientific Revolution. Gale, Cengage, 2011. 
Ancient Egyptian Arts and Architecture. Gale, Cengage, 2011. ISBN P78-142050674-7
Classical Civilization: Greece. Morgan Reynolds, 2011. 
Classical Civilization: Rome. Morgan Reynolds, 2011. 
Polar Explorations. Gale, Cengage, 2011. 
The Birth of Christianity. Morgan Reynolds, 2012. 
The Gods and Goddesses of Greek Mythology. Compass Point Books, 2012. 
The Heroes and Mortals of Greek Mythology. Compass Point Books, 2012. 
The Epics of Greek Mythology. Compass Point Books, 2012. 
The Mortals and Creatures of Greek Mythology. Compass Point Books, 2012. 
India. Children's Press, 2012. 
The Birth of Islam. Morgan Reynolds, 2012. 
Medieval European Art and Architecture. Lucent Books, 2012. 
Destined for Space: The Story of Space Travel. Capstone Press, 2012. 
Ancient Greek Arts and Architecture. Lucent Books, 2012. 
Ancient Roman Arts and Architecture. Lucent Books, 2012. 
Frank Lloyd Wright. Lucent Books, 2012. 
Leonardo da Vinci. Lucent Books, 2012. 
Ancient Greece. Compass Point Books, 2012. 
Mesopotamia. Compass Point Books, 2012. 
Ancient Greek Mythology. Gale, Cengage, 2012. 
Ancient Roman Mythology. Gale, Cengage, 2012. 
Persian Mythology. Gale, Cengage, 2013. 
American Mythology. Gale, Cengage, 2013. 
Babylonian Mythology. Gale, Cengage, 2013. 
The Alamo. Lucent Books, 2013. 
Special Operations: Training. Morgan Reynolds, 2013. 
Special Operations: Weapons. Morgan Reynolds, 2013. 
Special Operations: Paratroopers. Morgan Reynolds, 2013. 
Special Operations: Snipers. Morgan Reynolds, 2013. 
The Pyramids of Giza. Norwood House Press, 2013.  
Life in a Nazi Concentration Camp. Reference Point Press, 2013.  
The Parthenon of Ancient Greece. Reference Point Press, 2013.  
Life in Ancient Mesopotamia. Reference Point Press, 2013. 
British Mythology. Gale, Cengage, 2013.  
The Presidency of Franklin D. Roosevelt. Compass Point Books, 2014.  
The Presidency of Abraham Lincoln. Compass Point Books, 2014.  
Medieval Knights and Chivalry. Reference Point Press, 2014.  
The Relocation of the American Indian. Reference Point Press, 2014.  
Slavery Through the Ages. Lucent Books, 2014.  
Blue Marble. Compass Point Books, 2014. 
Hitler in Paris. Compass Point Books, 2014.  
Life in Ancient Egypt. Reference Point Press, 2014.  
Medieval Warfare. Reference Point Press, 2014.  
North African Cultures in Perspective. Mitchell Lane Publishers, 2014.  
Civil War Witness. Capstone, 2014.  
The Split History of the Women's Suffrage Movement. Compass Point Books, 2014.  
Understanding Afghanistan Today. Mitchell Lane Publishers, 2014.  
Assassination and Its Aftermath. Capstone Press, 2014.  
Cloak of Destiny. Create Space, 2014.  
In the Air: Drones. Morgan Reynolds, 2014.  
In the Air: Bombers. Morgan Reynolds, 2014.  
In the Air: Missiles. Morgan Reynolds, 2014. 
Daily Life in Ancient Egypt. Raintree (England), 2015.  
Daily Life in Ancient Greece. Raintree (England), 2015.  
Daily Life in Ancient Rome. Raintree (England), 2015.  
Daily Life in the Islamic Golden Age. Raintree (England), 2015.  
The Golden Spike. Compass Point Books, 2015. 
Deadliest Dinosaurs. Reference Point Books, 2016. 
Ground Zero: How a Photograph Sent a Message of Hope. Compass Point Books, 2016. 
Monsters in Greek Mythology. Reference Point Press, 2016. 
Gods and Goddesses in Greek Mythology. Reference Point Press, 2016. 
Natural Phenomena in Greek Mythology. Reference Point Press, 2016. 
Teens and Eating Disorders. Reference Point Press, 2017. 
Bad Days in Battle. Raintree (England), 2017. 
Cause and Effect: The Ancient Aztecs. Reference Point Press, 2017. 
Cause and Effect: World War I. Reference Point Press, 2017. 
Cause and Effect: Ancient Greece. Reference Point Press, 2017. 
Cause and Effect: Ancient India. Reference Point Press, 2017. 
The Military Experience: In the Water: Submarines. Morgan Reynolds, 2017. 
The Military Experience: In the Water: Strategies and Tactics. Morgan Reynolds, 2017. 
Edward S. Curtis Chronicles Native Nations. Essential Library, 2017. 
Hubble Deep Field: How a Photograph Revolutionized Our Understanding of the Universe. Raintree, 2017. 
Transgender Life. Gale/Cengage, 2018. 
Nanotechnology and Medicine. Reference Point Press, 2018. 
Debates on the Holocaust. Reference Point Press, 2018. 
Debates on the Slave Trade. Reference Point Press, 2018. 
How Vaccines Changed the World. Reference Point Press, 2018. 
The Women's Rights Movement. Reference Point Press, 2018. 
Understanding Christianity. Reference Point Press, 2018. 
Understanding Hinduism. Reference Point Press, 2018. 
Classic Stories of Greek Mythology. Reference Point Press, 2019. 
Heroes of Greek Mythology. Reference Point Press, 2019. 
The Lost Civilization of Atlantis. Reference Point Press, 2019. 
The Science and Technology of Track and Field. Reference Point Press, 2019. 
Villains of Greek Mythology. Reference Point Press, 2019. 
Why Should I Care About the Greeks? Capstone Press, 2020. 
Changing Lives Through Robotics. Reference Point Press, 2020. 
Egyptian Mythology. Reference Point Press, 2020. 
Hindu Mythology. Reference Point Press, 2020. 
Chinese Mythology. Reference Point Press, 2020. 
Understanding Gender Identity. Reference Point Press, 2021. 
The Science of Vaccines. Reference Point Press, 2021. 
Stand Up for LGBTQ Rights. Reference Point Press, 2021. 
The Bubonic Plague and Black Death. Reference Point Press, 2021.

References

External links
Official Website

21st-century American historians
21st-century American male writers
American male composers
21st-century American composers
American children's writers
Writers from Columbia, Missouri
1947 births
Living people
Worcester State University alumni
People from Natick, Massachusetts
Composers from Columbia, Missouri
Historians from Massachusetts
21st-century American male musicians
American male non-fiction writers